Sawlog Township is a township in Hodgeman County, Kansas, USA.  As of the 2000 census, its population was 93.

Geography

Transportation
Sawlog Township contains one airport or landing strip, Jetmore Municipal Airport.

References
 USGS Geographic Names Information System (GNIS)

External links
 US-Counties.com
 City-Data.com

Townships in Hodgeman County, Kansas
Townships in Kansas